James Harley (21 February 1917 – 7 September 1989) was a Scottish footballer who played for Liverpool.

Life and playing career
Born in Methil, Fife, Harley played for Hearts of Beath before George Patterson brought him to Liverpool in April 1934. His debut came 28 September 1935 in a First Division match at Anfield against West Bromwich Albion. Liverpool won the match 5–0; Harley did not score.

Harley never really established himself at first but he stayed loyal to the club and got his chance during the 1937–38 season, missing ten of the 47 fixtures, he was even swapped over to the left-back berth when Liverpool brought Tom Cooper into the starting line-up.

Harley carried on in much the same way with 27 appearances in 45 matches, yet again he started the three opening games of the 1939–40 and probably would have carried on playing in either of the full-back roles if it were not for the outbreak of the Second World War curtailing the careers of Harley and his peers. During the conflict he served with the Royal Naval Commandos, and featured for the Reds in unofficial wartime competitions, rarely until 1944 but more regularly thereafter.

After the six-year break Harley returned to Merseyside and played in 17 games of the first post-war championship winning team, a side that contained the likes of Jack Balmer, Bill Jones, Berry Nieuwenhuys, Albert Stubbins, Billy Liddell and Bob Paisley.

The 1947–48 season saw Harley put together 21 starts for Liverpool but this to be his last season at Anfield. He was now in his 30s and was no longer seen as a part of the future of the club, and departed when his contract expired in 1948.

Harley never got a call for Scotland but he did represent them in two wartime internationals, which are not regarded as 'official' fixtures.

Honours
Liverpool
Football League champions: 1946–47

References

1917 births
1989 deaths
Footballers from Fife
Scottish footballers
Association football fullbacks
Liverpool F.C. players
English Football League players
Royal Navy personnel of World War II
Scotland wartime international footballers
Hearts of Beath F.C. players
Scottish Junior Football Association players